Chaplain is also a surname. Notable people with the surname include:

 Jules-Clément Chaplain (1839–1909), French sculptor
 Olivier Chaplain (born 1982), French rugby union player
 Roland Chaplain (born 20th century), English lecturer and author
 Scott Chaplain (born 1983), Scottish footballer

See also
 Chaplain
 Chaplin